Evan Golden may refer to:
 Evan Golden (actor), American TV personality, actor, and producer
 Evan Golden (wrestler) (born 2000), American professional wrestler